Norwich School is an independent fee-paying school in Norwich, England. 

Norwich School may also refer to:

Norwich School of Painters, 19th century provincial art movement in Britain
Norwich School (glassmakers), mediaeval Norwich-based community of stained glass makers
Norwich University of the Arts, formerly Norwich School of Art & Design in Norwich, England
Norwich High School for Girls, independent girls fee-charging school with selective entry in Norwich, England
Norwich High School for Boys, short-lived independent school, that became the Langley School, Norfolk, England
City of Norwich School, secondary comprehensive school situated in Norwich, England
Norwich Law School, part of the UEA in Norwich, England
Norwich High School, located at Midland Drive in Norwich, New York, United States of America